The 2007–08 2. Bundesliga was the 34th season of the 2. Bundesliga, the second tier of Germany football league. It began on 10 August 2007 and ended on 18 May 2008.

Borussia Mönchengladbach, TSG 1899 Hoffenheim and 1. FC Köln were promoted to the Bundesliga.
Kickers Offenbach, FC Erzgebirge Aue, SC Paderborn 07 and FC Carl Zeiss Jena were relegated to the new 3. Liga.

League table
In the previous season, 1. FSV Mainz 05, Alemannia Aachen and Borussia Mönchengladbach were relegated to this division from the Bundesliga, and SV Wehen Wiesbaden, TSG 1899 Hoffenheim, FC St. Pauli and VfL Osnabrück were promoted from the Regionalliga.

Results

Top scorers

Stadia

External links
 Official Site of the DFB 
 kicker.de 
 Official Bundesliga site  
 Official Bundesliga site 

2. Bundesliga seasons
2007–08 in German football leagues
Germany